The Dandongadale River, a perennial river of the North-East Murray catchment of the Murray-Darling basin, is located in the Alpine region of Victoria, Australia. It flows from the northern slopes of the Alpine National Park in the Australian Alps, joining with the Buffalo River in remote national park territory.

Location and features
The river flows generally north by east all of its course through the remote national park, joined by the Rose River, before reaching its confluence with the Buffalo River within the Mount Buffalo National Park. The river descends  over its  course.

Near its source, the river is impounded by the naturally forming  Lake Cobbler. From the lake, the river spills over the Dandongadale Falls, the highest waterfall in Victoria, descending  over successive cascades in a series of significant drops, culminating in the final drop over the Cobbler Plateau. Camping and hiking facilities are located in the area.

See also

References

External links

North-East catchment
Rivers of Hume (region)
Alpine National Park